Eutresis is a genus of clearwing (ithomiine) butterflies, named by Edward Doubleday in 1847. They are in the brush-footed butterfly family, Nymphalidae.

Species
Arranged alphabetically:
Eutresis dilucida Staudinger, 1885
Eutresis hypereia Doubleday, [1847]

References 

Ithomiini
Nymphalidae of South America
Nymphalidae genera
Taxa named by Edward Doubleday